The Museum of Russian Impressionism is an art museum in Moscow dedicated to Russian art at the turn of the twentieth century.

History

The Museum of Russian Impressionism opened on 28 May 2016. It was established by Boris Mints, a Russian entrepreneur (chairman of the board of directors, 01 group), public figure, and patron of the arts. A collector of turn-of-the-century Russian art since 2001, his collection includes works of painters such as Konstantin Korovin, Igor Grabar, Konstantin Yuon, Petr Konchalovsky, Yuri Pimenov, Boris Kustodiev, and Valentin Serov. The permanent exposition of the museum is based on these Russian artists from the personal collection of Boris Mints.

In 2012, British architectural bureau John McAslan + Partners began the project of its restoration. This building is known for its unusual shape — it is a cylinder with a rectangular parallel piped on the roof. The mill was converted into a modern museum, ready to open in 2016.

As an institution, the museum began operation in 2014 before relocating to a late nineteenth-century Bolshevik mill. It held several exhibitions not only in Moscow and other Russian cities but also abroad in Venice and Freiburg. In December 2016, it entered the long list of nominees for the Art Newspaper Russia awards.

Collections

In The Park (1880) by Russian Impressionist Konstantin Korovin is the earliest painting featured in the museum. It relates to the period when Russian art made its first steps toward Impressionism. Several masterpieces from the museum's collection have been brought back to their homeland by the Museum's founder. Both Pyotr Konchalovsky's works in the Museum collection once belonged to Western collectors, as did Nikolaj Dubovskoy's Mountain Village, Summer by Nikolaj Bogdanov-Belsky, and Venice by Boris Kustodiev. Konstantin Korovin's Gurzuf was also purchased at one European auction. Paintings by Igor Grabar, Konstantin Yuon, and Yury Pimenov have rarely been exhibited to date. They now are displayed in the Museum of Russian Impressionism. Concerning contemporary artworks, the most recent of them are those by Valery Koshlyakov (the series Postcards dating from 2012).

References

External links
 
 Collection of Russian impressionist art

Art museums and galleries in Moscow
Museums established in 2014
2014 establishments in Russia